The 2019–2023 ICC Cricket World Cup League 2 was the first edition of the ICC Cricket World Cup League 2, a cricket tournament which formed part of the 2023 Cricket World Cup qualification process. The tournament was played from August 2019 to March 2023, with all matches played as One Day Internationals (ODIs). Each set of fixtures was planned to take place as a tri-series.

Scotland, Nepal and the United Arab Emirates were joined by the top four teams from the 2019 ICC World Cricket League Division Two tournament. Round 1 was played in Aberdeen, Scotland in August 2019.

The league table combined both the qualification for the 2023 World Cup with the system of promotion and relegation for the following editions of the various Cricket leagues.  For qualification to the World Cup, the top three teams advanced directly to the 2023 Cricket World Cup Qualifier tournament, while the bottom four teams were sent to the 2023 ICC Cricket World Cup Qualifier Play-off..  In that Play-off those bottom four teams were joined by the top two teams from the Challenge League, with the top two teams from that Play-off advancing to the Qualifier Tournament.

For promotion, it was originally intended that the top ranked team in this CWC League 2 would gain the opportunity to be promoted to the 2020–2023 ICC Cricket World Cup Super League if it finished higher than the 13th-placed Super League team at the 2023 Cricket World Cup Qualifier. However, in November 2021, the ICC announced that there would not be a second edition of the Super League, guaranteeing that Scotland would remain in the next League 2.

For relegation, United Arab Emirates and Papua New Guinea finished 6th and 7th, respectively.  As a result, the Play-off tournament for them not only determined qualification for the World Cup, but also whether or not they would be relegated to the Challenge League.  Among the six teams in that Play-off, the two two teams among the United Arab Emirates, Papua New Guinea, Canada and Jersey (who had finished in the top two of the Challenge League), would qualify for the next edition of League 2.  For the teams that finished 4th and 5th, Namibia and The United States, the play-off would determine only their World Cup qualification--even last place finishes for those teams would not result in relegation. 

Scotland secured first place in the league on 15 February 2023 with a 10-wicket win against Namibia. They were presented with the trophy at the end of round 19 of the tournament in Kirtipur.  Oman and Nepal finished in second and third, respectively, with Nepal winning 11 of their final 12 matches to pass Namibia in the final match of the tournament and secure a place in the 2023 Cricket World Cup Qualifier tournament.

Teams

The top three teams in the ICC Cricket World Cup League 2 qualified for the World Cup Qualifier while the bottom four went to the Qualifier Play-off.

Fixtures
The International Cricket Council (ICC) confirmed the following schedule of fixtures. In December 2020, the ICC announced a revised schedule following the disruption caused by the COVID-19 pandemic. In March 2022, the ICC issued a further update for rounds 9 to 15, with those rounds scheduled to take place from March to August 2022.

As originally planned, each team would host three tri-series, each time joined by a different two of the other six teams. Each tri-series would comprise six matches (two between each pair of teams). Therefore, over the course of the whole tournament, each team would play each other team twice at home, twice away, and twice at a neutral venue. Some matches had to be rescheduled for different times and venues (see below), so this original schedule did not happen fully as planned, but the teams remain on course to play a total of six fixtures against each other team.

Alterations

Two of Oman's home matches were cancelled during round 4, and they were ultimately played as part of a home bilateral series (against the UAE in February 2022) and as an additional game (against Namibia) in round 9 in the UAE.

On 13 March 2020, round 6, scheduled to take place in Lauderhill, Florida in April 2020, was postponed due to the COVID-19 pandemic and travel restrictions to the United States. On 24 March 2020, the ICC also confirmed that rounds 7 and 8, scheduled to take place in Namibia and Papua New Guinea respectively, had also been postponed. Round 9, scheduled to take place in Scotland in July 2020, was postponed on 10 June 2020. Round 10, scheduled to take place in Namibia in September 2020, was postponed on 23 July 2020.

In February 2021, the ICC confirmed that (newly numbered) rounds 6, 7, and 8 of their updated schedule had also been postponed. Round 6 was scheduled to take place in Oman, with rounds 7 and 8 originally scheduled to be played in Papua New Guinea. Round 8 was rescheduled to take place in Namibia during November and December 2021. However, only two matches were played before the remaining fixtures were postponed due to the discovery of a new variant of COVID-19 in Southern Africa.

In February 2022, Oman and the UAE played a three-match bilateral series in Oman to make up for games that had been postponed during the earlier tri-series in Oman and Namibia. In April 2022, Papua New Guinea's home tri-series against Oman and Scotland (round 11) was played in the UAE. In February 2023, the UAE hosted Namibia for a two-match bilateral series to make up for games that had been postponed during round 8 in Namibia. The UAE hosted two tri-series against Nepal and Papua New Guinea (rounds 10 and 20), including one that would originally have been played in Papua New Guinea.

Results

Results from the home and away matches are as follows:

Results from the neutral venue matches are as follows:

Points table

Statistics

Most runs

Highest individual score

Most wickets

Best bowling figures in an innings

References

External links
 Tournament home at ESPN Cricinfo

 
2023 Cricket World Cup
International cricket competitions in 2019
International cricket competitions in 2019–20
International cricket competitions in 2020
International cricket competitions in 2020–21
International cricket competitions in 2021
International cricket competitions in 2021–22
International cricket competitions in 2022
Current cricket seasons